Maisy Collis (born 23 January 2002) is an English professional footballer who plays as a midfielder for Cheltenham Town of the FA Women's National League South.

Club career

Bristol City 
Collis joined the Bristol City RTC aged 10 and was part of the academy team that contested the WSL Academy Plate final against Liverpool in April 2019. She was promoted to the first team during the 2019–20 season, making her senior debut on 21 November 2019, entering as a 64th minute substitute in a 7–0 League Cup group stage defeat away to Arsenal. She made her WSL debut against the same opposition on 1 December 2019, a game Arsenal won by a record 11–1 scoreline.

Career statistics

Club

References 

Living people
2000 births
English women's footballers
Bristol City W.F.C. players
Women's Super League players
Women's association football midfielders